Yılmaz Köksal (15 July 1939 – 22 October 2015) was a Turkish actor. He appeared in more than one hundred films from 1965 to 2011.

Selected filmography

References

External links 

1939 births
2015 deaths
Turkish male film actors
People from Kırşehir
Deaths from cancer in Turkey
Deaths from prostate cancer